Hierodoris is a genus of moths in the family Oecophoridae. It was first described by Edward Meyrick in 1912. This genus is only known from New Zealand. In 1988 the genus Taoscelis was synonymised with Hierodoris. In 2005 the genus Coridomorpha was synonymised with Hierodoris.

Species
The species that are currently placed in this genus are:
Hierodoris atychioides (Butler, 1877)
Hierodoris bilineata (Salmon, 1948)
Hierodoris callispora (Meyrick, 1912)
Hierodoris electrica (Meyrick, 1889)
Hierodoris eremita Philpott, 1930
Hierodoris extensilis Hoare, 2012
Hierodoris frigida Philpott, 1923
Hierodoris gerontion Hoare, 2005
Hierodoris huia Hoare, 2005
Hierodoris illita (Felder & Rogenhofer, 1875)
Hierodoris insignis Philpott, 1926
Hierodoris iophanes Meyrick, 1912
Hierodoris pachystegiae Hoare, 2005
Hierodoris polita Hoare, 2005
Hierodoris sesioides Hoare, 2005
Hierodoris s-fractum Hoare, 2005
Hierodoris squamea (Philpott, 1915)
Hierodoris stella (Meyrick, 1914)
Hierodoris stellata Philpott, 1918
Hierodoris torrida Hoare, 2005
Hierodoris tygris Hoare, 2005
However as at 2005 the placement of both Hierodoris insignis and Hierodoris stellata in this genus is in doubt.

References

Oecophoridae
Endemic fauna of New Zealand
Taxa named by Edward Meyrick
Endemic moths of New Zealand